Oplismenus hirtellus (commonly known as basket grass) is a flowering perennial plant from the family Poaceae that can be found on every continent in the world except Antarctica, growing mostly in coastal tropic and subtropic regions as well as tropical and subtropical islands such as Hawaii, New Zealand, Australia and Madagascar.

Description
Flowers appear from December to June. The plant is whitish on the lower surface and is very narrow near midrib.

It is self-pollinated plant whose seeds attract various animals and birds. The sticky seeds are easily distributed by animals and humans, easily adhering to fur and clothing.

Distribution

In the United States
Oplismenus hirtellus is considered native to the southeastern United States, growing in Alabama,  Arkansas,  Florida,  Georgia,  Louisiana,  Mississippi,  North Carolina,  South Carolina, Texas, and Oklahoma.

There has been some disagreement about the taxonomic classification of non-native Oplismenus in several states:

 In Maryland and Virginia an exotic invasive Oplismenus with white flowers was discovered in 1996 and identified as Oplismenus hirtellus subsp. undulatifolius but later recognized as the separate Oplismenus undulatifolius.
 In Hawaii, the grass was recorded in 1819 though not considered native to the state. With deep reddish flowers, the Hawaiian grass is most likely a form of the tropical Oplismenus hirtellus rather than the temperate O. undulatifolius. Because of its presence on the islands for over 150 years, it is referred to as a naturalized non-native, while its dominance in shaded forests suggests the species could be described as invasive.

References

Further reading

External links
 

hirtellus
Grasses of the United States
Endemic flora of the United States
Taxa named by Palisot de Beauvois
Flora without expected TNC conservation status